Ahmet Görkem Görk (born 30 June 1983) is a Turkish professional footballer who plays as a centre back for Eyüpspor.

References

External links

1983 births
Living people
People from Kadıköy
Footballers from Istanbul
Turkish footballers
Turkey youth international footballers
Galatasaray S.K. footballers
Beylerbeyi S.K. footballers
Sivasspor footballers
Eyüpspor footballers
Çaykur Rizespor footballers
Boluspor footballers
Konyaspor footballers
Adanaspor footballers
Elazığspor footballers
Süper Lig players
Association football defenders